The Football West Amateur League Premier Division is a regional Australian association football league comprising teams from Western Australia. The league sits at Level 4 on the Western Australian league system (Level 5 of the overall Australian league system). The competition is administered by Football West, the governing body of the sport in the state.

Format
The league operates with a promotion and relegation system, with relegation to the Amateur League Division 1, and potential for promotion to the State League Division 2 for the top team each year.

In 2020, promotion and relegation was suspended for the season, due to the impacts on the competition from the COVID-19 pandemic in Australia.

Clubs
The following 12 clubs competed in the 2020 Season:

Honours

Notes
 Ref: :Kreider 
 U undefeated league season

References

External links
Football West Official website

Soccer in Western Australia
fifth level football leagues in Asia